Rotary Youth Exchange (RYE) is a Rotary International student exchange program for students in secondary school. Since 1929, Rotary International has sent young people around the globe to experience new cultures. Currently, about 9,000 students are sponsored by Rotary Clubs every year. Typically, students are sent to another country for a year-long stay, generally living with multiple host families during the year and being expected to perform daily tasks within the household as well as attend school in the host country.  Short term exchange programs are also quite common. These typically involve direct student exchanges between two families arranged through Rotary to coincide with major school holiday periods.

History
The Rotary Club of Copenhagen, Denmark initiated the first Rotary exchange in 1927, and the Rotary Club of Nice, France followed suit soon after in 1929. Although exchanges today usually last ten months, the first exchanges took place during school vacations for only a couple of weeks. The year-long Rotary Youth Exchange program was created in 1958 in Lake Placid at a Rotary Governors assembly. Here, many rules and procedures were established that still exist today. The first year-long exchange conducted by Rotary under this new framework involved a student leaving from Scottsbluff, Nebraska to live in Myrtleford, Australia for 10 months, and two Australians from Myrtleford arriving in  Grand Lake, Colorado.  In the following years more and more countries became involved in the program. In 1962 the first involving Japan and Germany were arranged after tense relations between them and other Rotary International Clubs following World War II. Since its conception 80 years ago, the Rotary Youth Exchange program has expanded rapidly to exchange 9,000 students annually between 80 countries.

Vision
Through the Rotary Youth Exchange, Rotary International hopes to create a more interconnected and understanding world. One of Rotary's primary goals is promoting peace around the world, and through the Rotary Youth Exchange, it aims to make the world a more peaceful place one exchange at a time. This rationale follows the logic that if a students experience different cultures and meet people from all around the world, they will be more understanding of foreign people and countries in the future. Rotary expects that this understanding will lead to a more interconnected and peaceful world.

Sponsors
The Rotarians that participate in the program are volunteers. Many Rotarians are involved in various aspects of the youth exchange program including student selection, compliance with immigration and Rotary regulations, hosting, and supporting students. Each student is sponsored by a Rotary Club and Rotary District in their home country and is hosted by a Rotary Club and Rotary District in their host country.  Most districts have a chair for the Rotary Youth Exchange program and some also have committees. Each Rotary Club that hosts a student SHOULD provide both a Rotarian youth exchange officer and a Rotarian counselor for the student. The counselor is the student's contact person within the club and provides support to the student when needed (this does not always happen). Some districts are very active and host and send many students, other districts are less active and host fewer students. Some clubs do not even invite host students to attend weekly meeting while other clubs will actively encourage the students to attend.

The parent Rotary organization, Rotary International, has instituted a Certification Program which assesses individual RYE programs with a primary focus on quality control and student safety. Rotary groups are not permitted to participate in RYE programs without first obtaining RI Certification.

In 2003, an Australian woman accused the volunteer charity, Rotary, of failing to investigate or adequately respond to her allegations of repeated abuse by a Rotarian who was supposed to be looking after her during her exchange in 1967 when she was 15.

Events
Events for students vary from country to country and district to district, but exchange students may often be able to visit other parts of their host country and sometimes other countries while on exchange with their host families, schools, or Rotary. Many districts organize tours for the students they host, which may include weekend trips to nearby cities, tours of the host country that may last several weeks, and many students in Europe have the opportunity to take part in Eurotours which visit many countries and last two to four weeks. However, like most exchange programs, the primary purpose of Rotary Youth Exchange is to provide a cultural and academic exchange and significant independent travel by students is therefore not allowed.

Terminology

Exchange students are called "outbounds" by their home (sponsor) Rotary club and district, and simultaneously "inbounds" by their host Rotary club and district in the country they spend their year in. Students who have completed their exchanges are called "rebounds".  Rebounds can earn the title of "Rotex" in various ways depending on their host district. Some districts create requirements for rebounds to complete before becoming Rotex, while others simply allow all rebounds to become rotex. "Rotex" participate in the organization Rotex for helping exchangers.  There is also the rare "yo-yo" - a student who has been on two exchanges. Other slang includes the terms "newbies" and "oldies".  Due to the arrival of many of the southern hemisphere students in January and the northern hemisphere students in August, there is a group of students that are half a year behind or ahead of that current generation.  A student from an older generation is an oldie and students from newer generation are newbies.  This half year delay can be helpful in mentoring the newer students into an exchange student's lifestyle.  Another slang word that is used is "dinosaur", which can refers to one's oldie's oldie. Other terms include "Northie" and "Southie", referring to student from either a northern or southern (respectively) hemisphere country, which affects the time period that an exchanger will spend in their host country. A Southie will usually depart either January or February, staying in their host country until the beginning of the next year, while a Northie usually leaves in August or September and stays until the following June or July. This is usually dependent on the students' home country. A student from the United States will almost always leave in August or September and will stay until June or July. This can result in back-to-back summers, if a student travels to the southern hemisphere.

How to Participate
High school students from 15 to 19 years of age are eligible to apply to the Rotary Youth Exchange program. To apply, a student can get in contact with his/her local Rotary club through the Rotary International website. Students in North America can connect with Rotary Youth Exchange through the website studyabroadscholarships.org. The typical application cycle begins in the September of the year before exchange,  and includes various stages of interviews and paperwork. The length and exactitudes of this process depend on which Rotary district the student is from and which Rotary district he or she will travel to. Some families choose to simply host an exchange student and not send a child on exchange. A family interested in hosting an exchange student can get started by contacting his/her local Rotary club.

Rules of Exchange
Rotary is somewhat known for their use of the "Four D's" as a way to protect their students. While abroad, Rotary students cannot Drink, Drive, Date or do Drugs. Being caught doing any of these things is grounds to be sent home. On average about 300 students are sent home a year. Within some Rotary districts there is a fifth D to avoid, Disfigurement. This rule mainly covers tattoos and piercings, but also carries over to less permanent, but still frowned upon practices, such as shaving one's head or dying hair crazy colors. Students are also expected to follow the law of the country they will be living in abroad.

Exchange Destinations
Of the more than 200 countries affiliated in some way with Rotary International, 80 countries typically participate in the Youth Exchange every year. The countries that participate vary from year to year, but the core members of the program (most notably in North America, Europe, and Asia) are always involved. Even though over 80 countries participate in the program, students do not have the ability to choose any country out of the 80. The Rotary district in which a student lives has a great impact on the countries he/she can go to. Most Rotary districts allow a student to pick various countries of his/her choice from a list of 20 or 30 countries, and there is no guarantee that a student will be sent to one of his/her choices. Some Rotary districts, notably in Japan, will not give prospective students any say in their country selection process. Some exchange destinations have age limitations, so an 18 year old applicant may not be able to go to as many countries as a 17 year old applicant.

Preparing to go Abroad
Once accepted into the program it is up to the student to get themselves equipped and ready to go abroad. The responsibilities of the student and their family includes: 

Getting your Passport - Students should apply for their passport as soon as they are accepted into the program, as the process may take several weeks. 

Student Visa and guarantee forms -  Students may be required to complete a visa application and, as part of the formal Youth Exchange
application, and they will be required to complete a guarantee form. Rotarians facilitate the guarantee form process.

Airline Tickets - While in many Rotary districts, the sponsor club will help purchase the tickets, in some they do not. Students and their families need to be prepared to have to take this responsibility unto themselves. 

Health Insurance - In many Rotary districts, Insurance is included within the exchange fee; However, when it is not, students still need to have travel health insurance before their departure date. 

Immunization documentation - Most students are required to have immunization documentation. Local health departments and consular
officials can help students determine the required or recommended immunizations for the countries they are traveling to. Students should check with Rotarians from their sponsor club to determine whether additional health documentation will be necessary in the host country.

Dental and Medical Examinations" - Students may need to have a thorough pre-exchange medical and dental examination.The application
includes an examination form that must be completed by a health care provider.

Blazers
Today, many Rotary Exchange students can be recognized by their Rotary Youth Exchange blazer. While most countries recommend navy blue, the blazer may also be dark green, red, black, or maroon. The color of the blazer usually depends on which country or region the exchange student is from.  One Rotary tradition is that students cover their blazers in pins and patches they have traded with other students or bought in places they have visited as evidence of their exchange.

Blazer colors (for countries with more than one color, the main one is in bold, the other ones are used in some regions):

 Dark Blue
  Argentina  Austria
  Belgium
  Bermuda
  Bolivia
  Brazil
  Canada
  Colombia
  Czech Republic
  Denmark
  Ecuador
  Finland
  Germany
  Hungary
  India
  Japan
  Italy
  Mexico
  Norway
  Paraguay 
  Peru
  Philippines
  Poland
  Romania
  Russia
  Slovakia
  Spain
  South Korea
  Sweden
  Taiwan
  Thailand  United States   Lithuania

 Black
  Chile
  New Zealand
  Turkey
  Zimbabwe

 Green
  Australia
  South Africa
  United States
  Taiwan

 Bordeaux
  Thailand
  Switzerland
  United States

 Red
  CanadaRed Wine
  Venezuela

 White
  Argentina

 Light Blue 
  France
  Finland'''

 Varies by year
  Indonesia

 Orange 
  Netherlands

Purple

  Louisiana (D6840)
  Mississippi (D6840)

References

External sources
Rotary Youth Exchange from Rotary International
Rotary International

Student exchange
Rotary International